Shiley may refer to:

Bjork–Shiley valve, mechanical heart valve prosthesis
Donald Shiley, one of the co-inventors of Pfizer's Bjork-Shiley heart valve
Jean Shiley (1911–1998), former American high jumper
Shiley tube, a cuffed tracheostomy tube